, formerly designated C8FF042, was a small, harmless ≈1-metre near-Earth asteroid or meteoroid that impacted Earth's atmosphere on 19 November 2022 at 08:27 UT in Southern Ontario, Canada, above the Golden Horseshoe region, southwest of Toronto. Meteorites were detected by weather radar during dark flight.

Discovery
The asteroid was discovered three hours before impact by David Rankin at Mount Lemmon Observatory, during routine observations for the Mount Lemmon Survey. Using the first four images of the asteroid, Scout estimated a 25% chance of an Earth impact. The next four images raised the chance to 50%. Within about a hour further observations raised the chance of impact to 100%. The final observation was from Mauna Kea, 32 minutes before impact, just before it entered Earth's shadow. The asteroid brightened to about apparent magnitude 15 (about the brightness of Pluto) before disappearing into Earth's shadow. 

It is the sixth successfully-predicted asteroid impact. With an absolute magnitude of 33.6, it is the smallest asteroid discovered while it was in space.

Impact 
A meteorite fall was presumed to have occurred along the south shores of Lake Ontario, from east of Grimsby to Niagara-on-the-Lake with most meteorites landing in the water. Larger fragments would have fallen farther to the east. During dark flight, weather radar signatures appeared from an altitude of ~15 km down to 850 metres. Meteorites should have a fresh black fusion crust. Most findable fragments would likely be around 5 grams and the size of a nickel. The main mass might be the size of a soccer ball and be located between Port Weller and Virgil.

There was also an observed ordinary chondrite meteorite fall in Grimsby at 01:03 UT 26 September 2009 with 13 recovered meteorites totaling 215 grams (the main mass was 69 grams). The 2009 fall has a strewn field of 8 km x 4 km.

The Minor Planet Center noted that Earth's atmosphere was impacted above Brantford 70 km from Grimsby. The resulting sonic boom was mostly heard in Hamilton while the fireball was visible to observers in the Greater Toronto Area and as far as the U.S. states of Maryland, Ohio, Pennsylvania, and New York.

Orbit
The Apollo asteroid was inbound approaching a mid-December perihelion (closest approach to the Sun) when it impacted Earth.

 orbited from inside Earth's orbit with perihelion at 0.92 AU to the middle of the asteroid belt at 2.8 AU.

See also 
 Asteroid impact prediction
 Impact event
 , the first predicted asteroid impact in 2022

Notes

References

External links 
 Fireball observers location map
 
 
 
 Interview with the asteroid's discoverer David Rankin

20221119

Minor planet object articles (unnumbered)
Predicted impact events
November 2022 events in Canada
2022 in Ontario